Chris Vallillo is a singer-songwriter from central Illinois who performs folk music.

Biography

Early life and education

Chris Vallillo (born August 3, 1954, in Hammond, Indiana) grew up the son of a civil engineer who often moved the family, living in many parts of the U.S. Great Lakes region. Given a Kay Archtop guitar at age ten, while the family lived near Detroit, home of the Motown Records studios, Vallillo was inspired by folk musicians, such as Mississippi John Hurt and John Fahey.

In college, Vallillo met another folk musician, Steve Elliott, a banjoist, and they later formed a bluegrass band, The Granite Mountain Sluice Box Boys, named after a local landmark, and played college venues and parties. He completed his degree course at Beloit College in Wisconsin, and worked as an archaeologist for the next three years at Western Illinois University in Macomb, Ill.  There, he joined the country rock band Poker Flatts as sound engineer. Later he became a full-time member of the Carthage, Ill., country rock band Bear Creek and began writing songs and focusing more on music than on archaeology. Invited by Ken Carlysle to join his band, The Cadillac Cowboys, Vallillo spent the next five years as their guitarist and singer, performing often throughout the Midwest, with occasional gigs in New York City and in Key West, Fla.

1980–1990

In 1980 the band released the album "Live At The Black Stallion." The band had four songwriters – Vallillo, Ron Kimbrow, Ken Carlysle and Lonnie Ratliff – and went on to release a string of 45 rpm singles. Pedal steel player Marty Muse, who has been based in Austin for many years, was a band member during the early eighties. Vallillo left the band in late 1983 and began working as a soloist. In his early days as a solo act, Vallillo performed songs by writers such as Guy Clark, Townes Van Zandt, Gram Parsons and Jerry Jeff Walker, but gradually brought his own compositions into sets, particularly after making the transition to folk venues. In 1985, Vallillo was a New Folk finalist at the Kerrville Folk Festival.

In 1987, Vallillo released his first recording of original music, "The Western Illinois Rag." The recording sessions took place in Experimental Music Studio at the University of Illinois at Champaign, home of the first electronic music in the early 1960s. Support players included a fifteen-year-old fiddle player, Alison Krauss, and members of the original Union Station. There are currently plans to reissue the recording on CD. The following year, Vallillo served as the director of The Schuyler Arts Folk Music Collecting Project for the Illinois Arts Council and the Schuyler Arts Council. This Project was carried out in conjunction with the Library of Congress Folklife Centre. He interviewed and recorded oral histories and performances from the last of the pre-radio generation in Western Illinois. The collection was accepted into the Library of Congress Folklife Archives in 1988. 

His song "Goodbye Independent Trucker" and his instrumental "The Western Illinois Rag" were both included in a documentary about Bushnell, a small Illinois town.

1990–2000

In 1990, Vallillo was invited to become the performing host and co-producer of what became the award-winning syndicated radio program "Rural Route 3," a live musical performance show recorded with a studio audience. The program featured some of the finest names in acoustic and singer-songwriter music. Vallillo hosted and performed on each program along with two musical guests. During the seven year run of the show, these guests included Bob Gibson, John Hartford, Alison Krauss and Union Station, John Gorka, Tom Russell, Tish Hinojosa, The Austin Lounge Lizards, Norman and Nancy Blake, John McEuen, and Trout Fishing in America. At its peak, the show was heard on over 60 stations from Boston to Puerto Rico to Alaska. It remained on the airwaves till 1998. In 1995, the program gained the National Federation of Community Broadcaster's Bronze Reel Award. In its final season, the National Federation of Community Broadcasters awarded Rural Route 3 its Special Merit Award.

During this time, Vallillo composed, performed, and recorded the soundtrack music to the 13-part TV series "Illinois Historic Panorama" [1992/93]. He also went on to pen the theme song and soundtrack music for the 22-part TV series "The Civil War and Reconstruction" [1993/94] and continued to perform and tour full-time.

2000–present

During the early 2000s, Vallillo continued to perform throughout the Midwest. In 2001, he was again tapped by the Illinois Arts Council to conduct fieldwork, this time for the Illinois Mississippi River Valley Project, documenting the work of artists along the section of the Mississippi River that passes through the state. In 2003, he produced and hosted the Illinois Mississippi River Valley Project Festival featuring performers documented in the first phase of the project.

In 2006, Vallillo hosted and performed on Chicago Public Television's Arts Across Illinois Centerstage, Live! That year, he also took on the first of two tours as the Illinois State Scholar for New Harmonies, the Smithsonian Institution's traveling exhibition on Roots Music.

Throughout this time, Vallillo continued to perform and record full-time. His first project was "The Western Illinois Rag." It was followed in 1990 by "The Putnam Museum Concerts," a recording drawn from a series of concerts given by Vallillo in Davenport, Iowa, and focused on material documented in the first collecting project.

In 1995, between taping sessions for the "Rural Route 3" program, Vallillo teamed up with Grammy-winning producer Rich Adler, and traveled to Nashville to work on a new, original music project. The result was the 1995 release "Best Of All Possible Worlds" which featured some of the finest acoustic players in Nashville – folks like Roy Huskey Jr. on bass, Kenny Malone on drums, Rob Ikes on dobro, David Schnaufer on dulcimer, and Andrea Zahn on violin. "Best Of All Possible Worlds" was well received and generated airplay across the US and Europe.

In 2001, a family tragedy led Vallillo to return to his rural roots to record "Aural Traditions" [2001]. This recording also marked his move into the bottleneck slide style of playing, and featured music written and played between the 1860s and the 1930s by folks like Stephen Foster, The Carter Family, and Jimmie Rogers. Vallillo cut the tracks in his home studio, then mixed them at First Bass Audio in Macomb, I!linois. "Aural Traditions" marks the first of an ongoing series of self-produced recordings.

His 2005 release, "The Dance," represented a return to original and contemporary singer-songwriter material. Like "Aural Traditions," “The Dance" was recorded in Studio 13, his home recording studio, but for the first time, this project was mixed there as well. It contains seven original tunes, plus songs by John Gorka, Garnet Rogers, Greg Brown, Joel Mabus, and Stephen Foster, and was released in the early summer of 2005.

Immediately following the 2005 release of "The Dance," Vallillo began researching, writing, and performing a one-man show on the life of Abraham Lincoln. The resulting project, "Abraham Lincoln in Song," would go on to receive the endorsement of the Abraham Lincoln Bicentennial Commission, and resulted in a recording of the music from the show. The recording would go on to chart at No. 10 on the Billboard Bluegrass Album Charts in March 2008, and received excellent critical reviews.

Vallillo performed that show at hundreds of venues across the country, including the Abraham Lincoln Presidential Museum, the Gerald R. Ford Presidential Museum, The Krannert Center for the Performing Arts, The Ravinia Festival, The Gettysburg National Battlefield Museum, and President Lincoln's Cottage (Lincoln's summer White House).

Following the success of the Lincoln show, Vallillo turned towards a new project. He began to write and record his follow-up album,"The Last Day of Winter." He performed the nine instrumentals and four original songs in this collection on his own extensive collection of vintage instruments. These included a 1924 Gibson Tenor Lute, a 1936 wood bodied Dobro, a 1929 National Triolian (the oldest known to exist according to National Guitars), and a custom made reproduction of a turn-of-the-century Lyon and Healy nine-string parlor guitar.

Awards
A recipient of a 1986 Illinois Arts Council Artist Fellowship Award for music composition, Vallillo was also a nominee for the Illinois Arts Council's 1987 Governor's Award for Individual Artist. In 1987 he conducted the Schuyler Arts Folk Music Project to document the last of the pre-radio generation recordings. These recordings were accepted into the American Folklife Collection at the Library of Congress.

Full list of awards

 1985: Finalist at the Kerrville Folk Festival Songwriting Competition, Kerrville, Texas.
 1986: Illinois Arts Council Artists Fellowship Award for Music Composition.
 1987: Nominated for the Illinois Arts Council's Governor's Award for Individual Artist.
 1995: National Federation of Community Broadcaster's Bronze Reel Award for National Music/Entertainment Series for the Rural Route 3 Radio Show.
 1998: National Federation of Community Broadcaster's Special Merit Award for National Music/Entertainment Series for the Rural Route 3 Radio Show.
 2001: Administrative Fellowship, Illinois Arts Council to conduct the Illinois Mississippi River Valley Project.
 2007: Quality of Life Award for collecting historic music and producing musical events reflelctive of the roots music of rural Illinois.

Special projects
From 1990 through 1998 he served as the performing host and co-producer of the nationally distributed, award-winning public radio performance series Rural Route 3 where he performed next to (and with) a number of contemporary and traditional folk musicians. His most recent project, a one-man show titled Abraham Lincoln in Song, received the endorsement of the Abraham Lincoln Bicentennial Commission and the accompanying CD of music reached #10 on Billboard’s Bluegrass Album Chart in March 2008.

Full list of special projects

 1987: The Schuyler Arts Folk Music Collecting Project. Designed and carried out a music collecting project for the Illinois Arts Council and the Schuyler Arts Council in co-operation with the Library of Congress Folklife Center. The collection was accepted into the Library of Congress Folklife Archives in 1988.
 1992–1993: Illinois Historic Panorama. Composed, performed, and recorded the soundtrack for the 13-part public television series on the history of Illinois from the glaciers to the present.
 1993: Echoes Of A Country Schoolhouse. Commissioned by the Gardener Museum of Architecture, Quincy, IL to co-write and perform in a 2-person interactive play on the one room schoolhouse experience.
 1993–1994: The Civil War and Reconstruction. 22-part public television series. Composed, performed and recorded the theme song, arranged, performed and recorded period music on vintage instruments for the sound track.
 1990–1997: Host and co-producer of the award-winning nationally syndicated public radio series Rural Route 3.
 October 2000: Performer and Producer of the On the Farm Harvest Festival for the Museum of Science and Industry, Chicago, IL.
 2001–2002: Carried out the field work for the Illinois Arts Council's Illinois Mississippi River Valley Project, designed to document the artists along the Mississippi River.
 2003: Co-producing the Folk Songs of Illinois CD for the Illinois Humanities Council's Heritage Music Project CD series.
 2003: Artistic producer and performer for the Illinois Mississippi River Valley Project Festival, a weekend of workshops and performances August 15 and 16, in Galena, IL.
 2006: Host and performer on Chicago Public Television's Arts Across Illinois Centerstage, Live!
 2006–2008:Illinois State Scholar for the Smithsonian Institution's traveling exhibition on Roots Music, New Harmonies.

He recently completed his second term as the Illinois State Scholar for the Smithsonian Institution’s traveling exhibit on roots music New Harmonies and working on a new instrumental bottleneck slide guitar CD.

Albums

External links
 Musician celebrates Lincoln in song
 Chris Vallillo Homepage

American singer-songwriters
Living people
1954 births